Charles Kokougan (born 16 July 1982 in Paris, France) is a former professional footballer who played as a defender. Born in France, he represented the Togo national team internationally, earning one cap.

References

External links

1982 births
Living people
French sportspeople of Togolese descent
French footballers
Togolese footballers
Footballers from Paris
Citizens of Togo through descent
Association football defenders
Togo international footballers
Championnat National players
Championnat National 2 players
Championnat National 3 players
AS Beauvais Oise players
Levallois SC players